Peter Kane (1938 – 18 March 2004) was a British magician born in England. Kane created some memorable close-up magic effects. He contributed many routines to various magic periodicals.

Published works
 A Card Session
 Another Card Session (1971)
 A Further Card Session (1975)
 Combined Card Sessions (1982)
 Kane at the Card Table
 Kane's Variant
 Wild Card Plus
 Kane (1982)
 one card wonders

See also
List of magicians
Card magic
Coin magic
sleight of hand

External links
 
Peter Kane book website
Peter Kane biography
Peter Kane obituary

British magicians
1938 births
2004 deaths
Sleight of hand
Card magic
Coin magic